The House of the Tolling Bell is a 1920 American silent mystery film directed by J. Stuart Blackton and starring May McAvoy, Bruce Gordon, and Morgan Thorpe. It is based on a novel written by Edith Sessions Tupper.

Cast
 May McAvoy as Lucy Atheron 
 Bruce Gordon as Richard Steele 
 Morgan Thorpe as Anthony Cole 
 Edward Elkas as Innkeeper Ducros 
 Eulalie Jensen as Lola 
 William R. Dunn as Jules La Rocque 
 Edna Young as Aunt Stella 
 William Jenkins as Old George

References

Bibliography
 Goble, Alan. The Complete Index to Literary Sources in Film. Walter de Gruyter, 1999.

External links

1920 films
1920 mystery films
American mystery films
Films directed by J. Stuart Blackton
American silent feature films
1920s English-language films
Pathé Exchange films
American black-and-white films
1920s American films
Silent mystery films